Actor (gen.:  Aktoros) is a very common name in Greek mythology.  Here is a selection of characters that share this name (which means 'leader', from the verb άγω: to lead or carry):
 Actor, father of Eurytus who was an ally of Phineus during his fight with Perseus.
Actor, a king of Phthia, was said to be the son of King Myrmidon and Peisidice, daughter of Aeolus. Some say that Actor died childless, but others say that he is the father of Eurytion, his successor or of Irus, who was also called the father of Eurytion. According to Diodorus, Actor without an heir, was succeeded by Peleus who fled to his country from Aegina for killing his half-brother, Phocus. The hero was then purified by the king for his sins. This story was usually attributed to Actor's possible son Eurytion who was slain accidentally by his son-in-law Peleus. This Actor married Aegina, daughter of the river god Asopus, and had several children, among them Menoetius. Menoetius was counted among the Argonauts, and was the father of Patroclus (Achilles' very close companion).
 Actor, son of King Deioneus of Phocis and Diomede, daughter of Xuthus, thus a brother of Asterodeia, Aenetus, Phylacus, and Cephalus. This Actor could be the man referred by Hesiod as the father of Protesilaus, one of the suitors of Helen of Troy.
 Actor, son of Azeus, descendant of Phrixus, was ruler of the Minyans of Orchomenus.  He was father of Astyoche, who was seduced by the war-god Ares and bore him twin sons, named Ascalaphus and Ialmenus. These last two led the Minyan contingent to the Trojan War.
 Actor, son of Phorbas and Hyrmine, thus a brother of Augeas and Tiphys. He was king of Elis, and founded the city of Hyrmina, which he named after his mother. This Actor married Molione and became by her father of the twins known as the Molionides, Eurytus and Cteatus.
Actor, the Epean son of Poseidon and Agamede, daughter of King Augeas. He was the brother of Belus and Dictys.
Actor and Eurythemis were in one source called parents of Ancaeus (who other sources call the son of Lycurgus) and grandparents of Agapenor.
 Actor, the Achaean son of Hippasus from Pellene and one of the Argonauts.
Actor, a Lapith. He was killed by the centaur Clanis.
Actor, father of Sthenelus. Sthenelus followed Heracles in his campaign against the Amazons and was killed by them.
Actor, son of Acastus, was accidentally killed by Peleus while hunting. As a retribution, Peleus sent to Acastus some cows and sheep that had been killed by a wolf sent by Thetis.
 Actor, son of Oenops, brother of Hyperbius. He was among the defenders of the Borraean Gate at Thebes when the Seven against Thebes attacked the city, and confronted Parthenopaeus at the gate.
Actor, a warrior in the army of the Seven against Thebes. He saw a chasm open in the earth that swallowed Amphiaraus.
Actor, an old Theban servant of Antigone, the daughter of Oedipus. During the war of the Seven against Thebes, he accompanied her to the walls when that army appeared in front of the barriers outside the city. Because of his age, Actor  cannot follow the princess and he just stayed halfway up the climb to listen to her lament when she saw her brother in the enemy army.
 Actor, father of Echecles. His son married Polymele, mother of Eudoros by Hermes.
Actor, a shepherd in Lemnos who befriended Philoctetes in Euripides' play Philoctetes. According to some accounts, he was instead the king of Lemnos whose shepherd named Iphimachus, son of Dolops, took care the abandoned hero after he was bitten by a snake.
 Actor, one of the companions of the exiled Aeneas.  He is probably the same who in another passage is called an Auruncan, and of whose conquered lance Turnus made a boast. This story seems to have given rise to the proverbial saying "Actoris spolium" ("the spoil of Actor"), for any poor spoil in general.
Actor, father of Actoris (though unnamed in the Odyssey) who was given by Icarius to his daughter Penelope after her wedding with Odysseus to serve as her personal handmaiden.

Notes

References 

 Aeschylus, translated in two volumes. 1. Seven Against Thebes by Herbert Weir Smyth, Ph. D. Cambridge, MA. Harvard University Press. 1926. Online version at the Perseus Digital Library. Greek text available from the same website.
 Apollodorus, The Library with an English Translation by Sir James George Frazer, F.B.A., F.R.S. in 2 Volumes, Cambridge, MA, Harvard University Press; London, William Heinemann Ltd. 1921. . Online version at the Perseus Digital Library. Greek text available from the same website.
Apollonius Rhodius, Argonautica translated by Robert Cooper Seaton (1853-1915), R. C. Loeb Classical Library Volume 001. London, William Heinemann Ltd, 1912. Online version at the Topos Text Project.
 Apollonius Rhodius, Argonautica. George W. Mooney. London. Longmans, Green. 1912. Greek text available at the Perseus Digital Library.
 Diodorus Siculus, The Library of History translated by Charles Henry Oldfather. Twelve volumes. Loeb Classical Library. Cambridge, Massachusetts: Harvard University Press; London: William Heinemann, Ltd. 1989. Vol. 3. Books 4.59–8. Online version at Bill Thayer's Web Site
 Diodorus Siculus, Bibliotheca Historica. Vol 1-2. Immanel Bekker. Ludwig Dindorf. Friedrich Vogel. in aedibus B. G. Teubneri. Leipzig. 1888-1890. Greek text available at the Perseus Digital Library.
Gaius Julius Hyginus, Fabulae from The Myths of Hyginus translated and edited by Mary Grant. University of Kansas Publications in Humanistic Studies. Online version at the Topos Text Project.
 Gaius Valerius Flaccus, Argonautica translated by Mozley, J H. Loeb Classical Library Volume 286. Cambridge, MA, Harvard University Press; London, William Heinemann Ltd. 1928. Online version at theio.com.
 Gaius Valerius Flaccus, Argonauticon. Otto Kramer. Leipzig. Teubner. 1913. Latin text available at the Perseus Digital Library.
 Hesiod, Catalogue of Women from Homeric Hymns, Epic Cycle, Homerica translated by Evelyn-White, H G. Loeb Classical Library Volume 57. London: William Heinemann, 1914. Online version at theio.com 
 Homer, The Iliad with an English Translation by A.T. Murray, Ph.D. in two volumes. Cambridge, MA., Harvard University Press; London, William Heinemann, Ltd. 1924. Online version at the Perseus Digital Library.
 Homer. Homeri Opera in five volumes. Oxford, Oxford University Press. 1920. Greek text available at the Perseus Digital Library.
 Homer, The Odyssey with an English Translation by A.T. Murray, PH.D. in two volumes. Cambridge, MA., Harvard University Press; London, William Heinemann, Ltd. 1919. Online version at the Perseus Digital Library. Greek text available from the same website.
 The Orphic Argonautica, translated by Jason Colavito. © Copyright 2011. Online version at the Topos Text Project.
Pausanias, Description of Greece with an English Translation by W.H.S. Jones, Litt.D., and H.A. Ormerod, M.A., in 4 Volumes. Cambridge, MA, Harvard University Press; London, William Heinemann Ltd. 1918. Online version at the Perseus Digital Library
 Pausanias, Graeciae Descriptio. 3 vols. Leipzig, Teubner. 1903.  Greek text available at the Perseus Digital Library.
 Pindar, Odes translated by Diane Arnson Svarlien. 1990. Online version at the Perseus Digital Library.
 Pindar, The Odes of Pindar including the Principal Fragments with an Introduction and an English Translation by Sir John Sandys, Litt.D., FBA. Cambridge, MA., Harvard University Press; London, William Heinemann Ltd. 1937. Greek text available at the Perseus Digital Library.
 Publius Ovidius Naso, Metamorphoses translated by Brookes More (1859-1942). Boston, Cornhill Publishing Co. 1922. Online version at the Perseus Digital Library.
 Publius Ovidius Naso, Metamorphoses. Hugo Magnus. Gotha (Germany). Friedr. Andr. Perthes. 1892. Latin text available at the Perseus Digital Library.
 Publius Papinius Statius, The Thebaid translated by John Henry Mozley. Loeb Classical Library Volumes. Cambridge, MA, Harvard University Press; London, William Heinemann Ltd. 1928. Online version at the Topos Text Project.
 Publius Papinius Statius, The Thebaid. Vol I-II. John Henry Mozley. London: William Heinemann; New York: G.P. Putnam's Sons. 1928. Latin text available at the Perseus Digital Library.
 Publius Vergilius Maro, Aeneid. Theodore C. Williams. trans. Boston. Houghton Mifflin Co. 1910. Online version at the Perseus Digital Library.
 Publius Vergilius Maro, Bucolics, Aeneid, and Georgics. J. B. Greenough. Boston. Ginn & Co. 1900. Latin text available at the Perseus Digital Library.
 

Kings of Elis
Kings of the Myrmidons
Kings in Greek mythology
Argonauts
Children of Poseidon
Characters in the Aeneid
Characters in the Iliad
Characters in Seven against Thebes
Achaean characters in Greek mythology
Elean characters in Greek mythology
Phocian characters in Greek mythology
Minyan characters in Greek mythology
Thessalian characters in Greek mythology
Lapiths in Greek mythology